Sergia Elena de Séliman (née Mejía de Peña; born 1 October 1963) is a politician from the Dominican Republic. Since 19 November 2020 Séliman is a member of the Monetary Board of the Dominican Republic, the entity that oversees the Central Bank of the Dominican Republic and the Superintendency of Banks.

Biography
Séliman was elected in 2016 as a Dominican Republic deputy to the Central American Parliament, while her son Carlos Juan Séliman was her runningmate as vice-deputy. Previously she ran unsuccessfully to deputy for the National District in 2010 and vice-mayor of Santo Domingo in 2006. She also ran in the 2020 Dominican presidential elections as the runningmate of former President and Social Christian Reformist Party’s presidential candidate Leonel Fernández.

On November 16th, 2020, President Luis Abinader appointed her as a member of the Monetary Board.

References 

Living people
1963 births
People from Santo Domingo
Dominican Republic people of Spanish descent
Social Christian Reformist Party politicians
White Dominicans
Women members of the Congress of the Dominican Republic
21st-century Dominican Republic women politicians
21st-century Dominican Republic politicians